Pajarla is a village in Gudluru mandal, Sri Potti Sriramulu Nellore district, Andhra Pradesh, India. The village is famous for mangoes.

References

Villages in Prakasam district